Robert Hamilton may refer to:

Politics

U.S.
 Robert Hamilton (congressman) (1809–1878), U.S. Representative from New Jersey
 Robert K. Hamilton (1905–1986), American politician from Pennsylvania
 Robert Ray Hamilton (1851–1890), New York politician
 Robert S. Hamilton (1865–1940), American politician from Illinois
 Robert W. Hamilton (judge) (1899–1981), Justice of the Supreme Court of Texas

Canada
 Robert Hamilton (judge) (1753–1809), judge and political figure in Upper Canada
 Robert Hamilton (merchant) (1787–1856), political figure in Upper Canada
 Robert Hamilton (Northwest Territories politician) (1842–1911), Canadian politician
 Robert J. Hamilton (active since 2003), Canadian politician from Ontario

UK
 Robert Hamilton (Liberal politician) (1867–1944), Scottish Member of Parliament for Orkney and Shetland
 Robert Hamilton, 8th Lord Belhaven and Stenton (1793–1868), Scottish peer
 Robert Hamilton-Udny, 11th Lord Belhaven and Stenton (1871–1950), Scottish representative peer and soldier
 Robert Hamilton, 12th Lord Belhaven and Stenton (1903–1961), Scottish peer
 Sir Robert Hamilton, 6th Baronet, British politician and East India Company civil servant

Australia
 Robert Hamilton (civil servant) (1836–1895), Australian politician, governor of Tasmania
 Robert Bell Hamilton (1892–1948), Australian architect and politician

Religion
 Robert Hamilton of Preston (1650–1701), one of the leaders of the Scottish Covenanters
 Robert Hamilton (moderator, died 1581) (c.1530–1581), Church of Scotland minister, Moderator of the General Assembly in 1572
 Robert Hamilton (bishop) (c.1600-1649), Bishop of Caithness
 Robert Hamilton (moderator, died 1787) (1707–1787), twice Moderator of the General Assembly of the Church of Scotland
 Robert Hamilton (priest) (1853–1928), Dean of Armagh

Sports
 Robert Hamilton (Scottish footballer) (1877–1948), Scottish footballer often known as R.C. Hamilton
 Robert Hamilton (Irish footballer) (1907–1964), Northern Irish footballer who played for Rangers F.C.
 Bob "Bones" Hamilton (1912–1996), American football player
 Bob Hamilton (1916–1990), American professional golfer
 Bobby Hamilton (1957–2007), American stock car racing driver
 Bobby Hamilton (American football) (born 1971), American football defensive end
 Bobby Hamilton Jr. (born 1978), American stock car racing driver
 Bobby Hamilton (footballer) (1924–1999), English footballer for Chester and Yeovil

Others
 Robert Hamilton (Norwegian governor) (died 1677), Scottish born, Norwegian military officer and governor
 Robert Hamilton (economist) (1743–1829), Scottish economist and mathematician
 Robert Hamilton (advocate) (1763–1831), Scottish advocate and friend of Sir Walter Scott
 Robert Wilson Hamilton (1819–1904), American-born lawyer and judge in Fiji
 Robert Hamilton (archaeologist) (1905–1995), British archaeologist and academic
 Robert William Hamilton Jr. (1930–2011), hyperbaric physiologist
 Robert W. Hamilton (law professor) (1931–2018), American legal scholar
 Robert Hamilton (surgeon) (died c. 1832), president of the Royal College of Surgeons in Ireland
 Robert Hamilton of Briggis (died 1568), Scottish soldier and military engineer

See also
 Hamilton Bobby (died 2011), Indian international footballer
 Bob Hamilton (disambiguation)
 Robert W. Hamilton (disambiguation)
 Hamilton (name)